Yolo (You Only Live Once) is a Ghanaian teenage TV series. The series is a sequel of the Ghanaian TV series Things We Do for Love. It advises and directs the youth concerning the challenges they face in their adolescence. A television series produced and directed by Ivan Quashigah.

From Farm House Production, Yolo premiered in 2016. It airs on TV3 Ghana and Africa Magic.

Farmhouse Production introduced some new characters alongside the old one of which includes Kelvin Bruun as Mark Anthony, Ama Ampofo Ababio as Ariana, Akosua Asare Brewu as Tilly, and Joseph Delove August as Odenkyem. The script was written by  Selassie Yao and directed by Ivan Quashigah as usual.

‘The YOLO TV Series’ is a National Population Council initiative in partnership with Ghana Health Service, Ghana Education Service & National Youth Authority (Ghana) which is facilitated by Communicate For Health and FHI360 and funded by USAID.

Farm House Production announced episode 13 to be the final episode of the fifth season in August 2019. Season 6 received continued funding from the Ghanaian Ministry of Health.

Cast

Old
 Aaron Adatsi
 Queenstar Anaafi
 Chiiief
 JB Peasah
 Jackie Appiah
 Adjetey Anang
 Fella Makafui
 Evelyn Galle-Ansah
 Jason Edwards

New characters in season 5
Kelvin Bruun
Ama Ampofo Ababio
Akosua Asare Brewu
Joseph Delove August
Etornam Bedi
William Odartei Lamptey
Jelson Anum Ashitei

Writers
Eddie Seddoh(S1-4)
Selassie Yao(S5)

References

2010s Ghanaian television series